In group theory, a branch of mathematics, the automorphisms and outer automorphisms of the symmetric groups and alternating groups are both standard examples of these automorphisms, and objects of study in their own right, particularly the exceptional outer automorphism of S6, the symmetric group on 6 elements.

Summary

Generic case
 : , and thus .
Formally,  is complete and the natural map  is an isomorphism.
 : , and the outer automorphism is conjugation by an odd permutation.
 : 
Indeed, the natural maps  are isomorphisms.

Exceptional cases
 : trivial:
 
 
 : 
 : , and

The exceptional outer automorphism of S6 
Among symmetric groups, only S6 has a non-trivial outer automorphism,
which one can call exceptional (in analogy with exceptional Lie algebras) or exotic. In fact, Out(S6) = C2.

This was discovered by Otto Hölder in 1895.

The specific nature of the outer automorphism is as follows:
 the sole identity permutation maps to itself;
 a 2-cycle such as (1 2) maps to the product of three 2-cycles such as (1 2)(3 4)(5 6) and vice versa, there being 15 permutations each way;
 a 3-cycle such as (1 2 3) maps to the product of two 3-cycles such as (1 4 5)(2 6 3) and vice versa, accounting for 40 permutations each way;
 a 4-cycle such as (1 2 3 4) maps to another 4-cycle such as (1 6 2 4) accounting for 90 permutations;
 the product of two 2-cycles such as (1 2)(3 4) maps to another product of two 2-cycles such as (3 5)(4 6), accounting for 45 permutations;
 a 5-cycle such as (1 2 3 4 5) maps to other 5-cycles such as (1 3 6 5 2) accounting for 144 permutations;
 the product of a 2-cycle and a 3-cycle such as (1 2 3)(4 5) maps to a 6-cycle such as (1 2 5 3 4 6) and vice versa, accounting for 120 permutations each way;
 the product of a 2-cycle and a 4-cycle such as (1 2 3 4)(5 6) maps to another such permutation such as (1 4 2 6)(3 5) accounting for the 90 remaining permutations.

Thus, all 720 permutations on 6 elements are accounted for. The outer automorphism does not preserve cycle structure in general, mapping single cycles to the product of two cycles and vice versa.

This also yields another outer automorphism of A6, and this is the only exceptional outer automorphism of a finite simple group: for the infinite families of simple groups, there are formulas for the number of outer automorphisms, and the simple group of order 360, thought of as A6, would be expected to have two outer automorphisms, not four.
However, when A6 is viewed as PSL(2, 9) the outer automorphism group has the expected order.  (For sporadic groups – i.e. those not falling in an infinite family – the notion of exceptional outer automorphism is ill-defined, as there is no general formula.)

Construction 

Note that as an outer automorphism, it is a class of automorphisms, well-determined only up to an inner automorphism, hence there is not a natural one to write down.

One method is:
 Construct an exotic map (embedding) S5 → S6; see below
 S6 acts by conjugation on the six conjugates of this subgroup, yielding a map S6 → SX, where X is the set of conjugates. Identifying X with the numbers 1, ..., 6 (which depends on a choice of numbering of the conjugates, i.e., up to an element of S6 (an inner automorphism)) yields an outer automorphism S6 → S6.
 This map is an outer automorphism, since a transposition does not map to a transposition, but inner automorphisms preserve cycle structure.

Throughout the following, one can work with the multiplication action on cosets or the conjugation action on conjugates.

To see that S6 has an outer automorphism, recall that homomorphisms 
from a group G to a symmetric group Sn are essentially the same as actions
of G on a set of n elements, and the subgroup fixing a point is then a subgroup of index at most n in G. Conversely if we have a subgroup of index n in G, the action on the cosets gives a transitive action of G on n points, and therefore a homomorphism to Sn.

Construction from graph partitions 
Before the more mathematically rigorous constructions, it helps to understand a simple construction.

Take a complete graph with 6 vertices, K6. It has 15 edges, which can be partitioned into perfect matchings in 15 different ways, each perfect matching being a set of three edges no two of which share a vertex. It is possible to find a set of 5 perfect matchings from the set of 15 such that no two matchings share an edge, and that between them include all  edges of the graph; this graph factorization can be done in 6 different ways.

Consider a permutation of the 6 vertices, and see its effect on the 6 different factorizations. We get a map from 720 input permutations to 720 output permutations. That map is precisely the outer automorphism of S6.

Being an automorphism, the map must preserve the order of elements, but it does not preserve cycle structure. For instance, a 2-cycle maps to a product of three 2-cycles; it is easy to see that a 2-cycle affects all of the 6 graph factorizations in some way, and hence has no fixed points when viewed as a permutation of factorizations.

Exotic map S5 → S6 

There is a subgroup (indeed, 6 conjugate subgroups) of S6 which is abstractly isomorphic to S5, but which acts transitively as subgroups of S6 on a set of 6 elements. (The image of the obvious map Sn → Sn+1 fixes an element and thus is not transitive.)

Sylow 5-subgroups 
Janusz and Rotman construct it thus:
 S5 acts transitively by conjugation on the set of its 6 Sylow 5-subgroups, yielding an embedding S5 → S6 as a transitive subgroup of order 120.
This follows from inspection of 5-cycles: each 5-cycle generates a group of order 5 (thus a Sylow subgroup), there are 5!/5 = 120/5 = 24  5-cycles, yielding 6 subgroups (as each subgroup also includes the identity), and Sn acts transitively by conjugation on the set of cycles of a given class, hence transitively by conjugation on these subgroups.

Alternately, one could use the Sylow theorems, which state generally that all Sylow p-subgroups are conjugate.

PGL(2,5) 
The projective linear group of dimension two over the finite field with five elements, PGL(2, 5), acts on the projective line over the field with five elements, P1(F5), which has six elements. Further, this action is faithful and 3-transitive, as is always the case for the action of the projective linear group on the projective line. This yields a map PGL(2, 5) → S6 as a transitive subgroup. Identifying PGL(2, 5) with S5 and the projective special linear group PSL(2, 5) with A5 yields the desired exotic maps S5 → S6 and A5 → A6.

Following the same philosophy, one can realize the outer automorphism as the following two inequivalent actions of S6 on a set with six elements:
 the usual action as a permutation group;
 the six inequivalent structures of an abstract 6-element set as the projective line P1(F5) – the line has 6 points, and the projective linear group acts 3-transitively, so fixing 3 of the points, there are 3! = 6 different ways to arrange the remaining 3 points, which yields the desired alternative action.

Frobenius group 
Another way:
To construct an outer automorphism of S6, we need to construct 
an "unusual" subgroup of index 6 in S6, in other words one that is not one of the six obvious S5 subgroups fixing a point (which just correspond to inner automorphisms of S6).

The Frobenius group of affine transformations of F5 (maps x  ax + b where a ≠ 0) has order 20 = (5 − 1) · 5 and acts on the field with 5 elements, hence is a subgroup of S5.
(Indeed, it is the normalizer of a Sylow 5-group mentioned above, thought of as the order-5 group of translations of F5.)

S5 acts transitively on the coset space, which is a set of 120/20 = 6 elements (or by conjugation, which yields the action above).

Other constructions 
Ernst Witt found a copy of Aut(S6) in the Mathieu group M12 (a subgroup T isomorphic to S6 and an element σ that normalizes T and acts by outer automorphism). Similarly to S6 acting on a set of 6 elements in 2 different ways (having an outer automorphism), M12 acts on a set of 12 elements in 2 different ways (has an outer automorphism), though since M12 is itself exceptional, one does not consider this outer automorphism to be exceptional itself.

The full automorphism group of A6 appears naturally as a maximal subgroup of the Mathieu group M12 in 2 ways, as either a subgroup fixing a division of the 12 points into a pair of 6-element sets, or as a subgroup fixing a subset of 2 points.

Another way to see that S6 has a nontrivial outer automorphism is to use the fact that A6 is isomorphic to PSL2(9), whose automorphism group is the projective semilinear group PΓL2(9), in which PSL2(9) is of index 4, yielding an outer automorphism group of order 4. The most visual way to see this automorphism is to give an interpretation via algebraic geometry over finite fields, as follows.  Consider the action of S6 on affine 6-space over the field k with 3 elements.  This action preserves several things: the hyperplane H on which the coordinates sum to 0, the line L in H where all coordinates coincide, and the quadratic form q given by the sum of the squares of all 6 coordinates.  The restriction of q to H has defect line L, so there is an induced quadratic form Q on the 4-dimensional H/L that one checks is non-degenerate and non-split.  The zero scheme of Q in H/L defines a smooth quadric surface X in the associated projective 3-space over k. Over an algebraic closure of k, X is a product of two projective lines, so by a descent argument X is the Weil restriction to k of the projective line over a quadratic étale algebra K.  Since Q is not split over k, an auxiliary argument with special orthogonal groups over k forces K to be a field (rather than a product of two copies of k).  The natural S6-action on everything in sight defines a map from S6 to the k-automorphism group of X, which is the semi-direct product G of PGL2(K) = PGL2(9) against the Galois involution. This map carries the simple group A6 nontrivially into (hence onto) the subgroup PSL2(9) of index 4 in the semi-direct product G, so S6 is thereby identified as an index-2 subgroup of G (namely, the subgroup of G generated by PSL2(9) and the Galois involution). Conjugation by any element of G outside of S6 defines the nontrivial outer automorphism of S6.

Structure of outer automorphism 
On cycles, it exchanges permutations of type (12) with (12)(34)(56) (class 21 with class 23), and of type (123) with (145)(263) (class 31 with class 32). The outer automorphism also exchanges permutations of type (12)(345) with (123456) (class 2131 with class 61). For each of the other cycle types in S6, the outer automorphism fixes the class of permutations of the cycle type.

On A6, it interchanges the 3-cycles (like (123)) with elements of class 32 (like (123)(456)).

No other outer automorphisms 
To see that none of the other symmetric groups have outer automorphisms, it is easiest to proceed in two steps:
 First, show that any automorphism that preserves the conjugacy class of transpositions is an inner automorphism. (This also shows that the outer automorphism of S6 is unique; see below.) Note that an automorphism must send each conjugacy class (characterized by the cyclic structure that its elements share) to a (possibly different) conjugacy class.
 Second, show that every automorphism (other than the above for S6) stabilizes the class of transpositions.

The latter can be shown in two ways:
 For every symmetric group other than S6, there is no other conjugacy class consisting of elements of order 2 that has the same number of elements as the class of transpositions.
 Or as follows:

Each permutation of order two (called an involution) is a product of k > 0 disjoint transpositions, so that it has cyclic structure 2k1n−2k. What is special about the class of transpositions (k = 1)?

If one forms the product of two distinct transpositions τ1 and τ2, then one always obtains either a 3-cycle or a permutation of type 221n−4, so the order of the produced element is either 2 or 3. On the other hand, if one forms the product of two distinct involutions σ1, σ2 of type , then provided , it is always possible to produce an element of order 6, 7 or 4, as follows. We can arrange that the product contains either 
 two 2-cycles and a 3-cycle (for k = 2 and n ≥ 7)
 a 7-cycle (for k = 3 and n ≥ 7)
 two 4-cycles (for k = 4 and n ≥ 8)
For k ≥ 5, adjoin to the permutations σ1, σ2 of the last example redundant 2-cycles that cancel each other, and we still get two 4-cycles. 

Now we arrive at a contradiction, because if the class of transpositions is sent via the automorphism f to a class of involutions that has k > 1, then there exist two transpositions τ1, τ2 such that f(τ1) f(τ2) has order 6, 7 or 4, but we know that τ1τ2 has order 2 or 3.

No other outer automorphisms of S6 
S6 has exactly one (class) of outer automorphisms: Out(S6) = C2.

To see this, observe that there are only two conjugacy classes of S6 of size 15: the transpositions and those of class 23. Each element of Aut(S6) either preserves each of these conjugacy classes, or exchanges them. Any representative of the outer automorphism constructed above exchanges the conjugacy classes, whereas an index 2 subgroup stabilizes the transpositions. But an automorphism that stabilizes the transpositions is inner, so the inner automorphisms form an index 2 subgroup of Aut(S6), so Out(S6) = C2.

More pithily: an automorphism that stabilizes transpositions is inner, and there are only two conjugacy classes of order 15 (transpositions and triple transpositions), hence the outer automorphism group is at most order 2.

Small n

Symmetric 
For n = 2, S2 = C2 = Z/2 and the automorphism group is trivial (obviously, but more formally because Aut(Z/2) = GL(1, Z/2) = Z/2* = C1).  The inner automorphism group is thus also trivial (also because S2 is abelian).

Alternating 
For n = 1 and 2, A1 = A2 = C1 is trivial, so the automorphism group is also trivial. For n = 3, A3 = C3 = Z/3 is abelian (and cyclic): the automorphism group is GL(1, Z/3*) = C2, and the inner automorphism group is trivial (because it is abelian).

Notes

References 
 https://web.archive.org/web/20071227060045/http://polyomino.f2s.com/david/haskell/outers6.html
 Some Thoughts on the Number 6, by John Baez: relates outer automorphism to the regular icosahedron
 "12 points in PG(3, 5) with 95040 self-transformations" in "The Beauty of Geometry", by Coxeter: discusses outer automorphism on first 2 pages
 
 
 
 

Group theory
Finite groups
Permutation groups